Aya of Yop City (French title: Aya de Yopougon) is a 2013 French animated film directed by Marguerite Abouet and Clément Oubrerie and based on the graphic novel Aya of Yop City by the same authors. It was released on 17 July in France. It was nominated for the Best Animated Feature Film at the 39th César Awards.

Plot
The film takes place near the end of the 70s in the Yopougon neighborhood in Côte d'Ivoire. The story revolves around the lives of 19-year-old Aya and her friends and family. Aya's mother, Fanta, is the most trusted healer in the neighborhood. Aya's father Ignace is a salesman for the crumbling Solibra Brewery, owned by the magnate Bonaventure Sissoko. Aya is a studious young woman with dreams of studying medicine, but is opposed by her father, who wants her to get married and start a family. In contrast, Aya's best friends Bintou and Adjoua flirt with boys, party, and dream of opening beauty salons.

Everything changes when Adjoua gets pregnant during one of her flings. Deciding between getting an abortion or telling her family, Adjoua decides to go through with the pregnancy and claims the father is Moussa, the lazy and immature son of Sissoko and heir to Solibra Brewery. In reality, Moussa is not the father, but Adjoua convinces everyone in order to marry him and secure wealth and social status for her family. Sometime after the marriage and birth of the child, Sissoko becomes suspicious of Adjoua when he realizes the baby does not look like Moussa. The baby's father is revealed to be none other than the local playboy, Mamadou.

Meanwhile, Aya's other friend Bintou is having an affair with a "Parisian" named Gregoire, who unbeknownst to Bintou is actually a local imposter who saves up money for his womanizing escapades. Bintou hopes Gregoire will take her with him to Paris so she can live a luxurious life. Aya's father also has a small subplot involving a secret affair with his secretary, which he desperately tries to hide from his family amidst his crumbling job security.

Cast
 Aïssa Maïga : Aya
 Tella Kpomahou : Bintou
 Tatiana Rojo : Adjoua 
 Jacky Ido : Ignace / Hervé / Moussa / Basile / Sidiki / Arsène
 Émil Abossolo-Mbo : Kossi / Dieudonné / Gervais / Father Mamadou
 Eriq Ebouaney : Hyacinthe 
 Pascal N'Zonzi : Bonaventure Sissoko
 Atou Ecaré : Simone Sissoko
 Claudia Tagbo : Jeanne / Alphonsine
 Sabine Pakora : Koro / Modestine
 Jean-Baptiste Anoumon : Grégoire 
 Djédjé Apali : Mamadou
 Mokobé : DJ 
 Corinne Haccandy : Félicité 
 Diouc Koma : John Pololo
 Marguerite Abouet : Fanta

Accolades

References

External links

2010s French animated films
2013 animated films
2013 films
Films based on French comics
Animated films based on comics
Films set in Ivory Coast
Animated drama films
2010s French films